Emiel Faignaert (10 March 1919, in Sint-Martens-Lierde – 10 May 1980, in Ghent) was a Belgian cyclist.

He was professional from 1940 to 1950. In 1943, Faignaert won Antwerp-Ghent-Antwerp. His biggest success was in 1947 when he won the Tour of Flanders. Overall, he won 27 races.

In Faignaert's home town, a monument of him was erected in 2007.

Palmarès
Source:

1942
2nd of the Grand Prix de Wallonie
2nd of the Grote Prijs Stad Zottegem

1944
6th of Paris-Roubaix

1947
Tour of Flanders
2nd of Omloop Het Nieuwsblad

References

1919 births
1980 deaths
Belgian male cyclists
Cyclists from East Flanders
People from Lierde